Hugh Edward "Gob" Wilson II (January 14, 1899 – April 6, 1962) was an American college football and college baseball coach at Louisiana Tech University and a college basketball coach at Louisiana State University.

Wilson was an alumnus of the University of Michigan, where he played as an lineman for Hall of Fame Coach Fielding H. Yost's Michigan Wolverines football team from 1918 to 1921. He died in Ann Arbor, Michigan in 1962.

Head coaching record

Football

Basketball

Baseball

References

External links
 

1899 births
1962 deaths
American football guards
American football tackles
College men's basketball head coaches in the United States
Louisiana Tech Bulldogs and Lady Techsters athletic directors
Louisiana Tech Bulldogs baseball coaches
Louisiana Tech Bulldogs football coaches
LSU Tigers basketball coaches
Michigan State Spartans football coaches
Michigan Wolverines football players
People from Ionia, Michigan
Coaches of American football from Michigan
Players of American football from Michigan
Baseball coaches from Michigan
Basketball coaches from Michigan